Frederick Eugene "Gene" Steere (August 16, 1872 – March 13, 1942) was a Major League Baseball player. Steere played for the Pittsburgh Pirates in the  season. In 10 games, Steere had 8 hits in 39 at-bats. He attended Brown University.

Steere was born in South Scituate, Rhode Island and died in San Francisco, California.

External links

Pittsburgh Pirates players
1872 births
1942 deaths
Baseball players from Rhode Island
People from Scituate, Rhode Island
19th-century baseball players
Binghamton Bingoes players
Allentown Buffaloes players
New Bedford Whalers (baseball) players
New Bedford Browns players
Worcester (minor league baseball) players